Barangka is an administrative division of Marikina, Metro Manila, the Philippines. It is an urban barangay part of the 1st district of Marikina and is one of the oldest barangays in Marikina.

Located along the southwestern border of Marikina, with the Marikina–Infanta Highway and A. Bonifacio Avenue, which serve as thoroughfares connecting Quezon City and Marikina, and with the municipalities of San Mateo and Rodriguez (Montalban) in Rizal to the east, Barangka is considered to be a gateway for people going to and from Metro Manila and Rizal. It is bordered on the west by barangay Loyola Heights in Quezon City; to the south by barangays Industrial Valley and Calumpang; to the east by barangay Tañong; and to the north by Loyola Grand Villas.

History
Barangka takes its name from the Spanish word for "canyon", barranca, owing to the area's steep and hilly terrain. The area of Barangay Barangka is considered one of the earliest historical origins of Marikina when the Augustinians and Jesuits arrived in the area called chorrillo, a small stream located in the area (now called Chorillo, a known street located in this barangay). From 1939 to 1941, the sitio was under the jurisdiction of the then-newly established Quezon City before it was returned to Marikina.

Along with former Parang and Nangka, the former sitio was elevated to barangay by virtue of Republic Act No. 2601, which was enacted on June 21, 1959.

Geography
Barangka lies on the foothills of Quezon City and also over the West Valley fault systems. The Marikina River where the Marikina River Park and Riverbanks Center is located borders the barangay to the south.

Miscellaneous

Villages and subdivisions
Ateneo Housing
Dela Costa Homes
Landless Barangka
Loyola Subdivision
Loyola Grand Villas
Urban Bliss

Community facilities
Barangka Barangay Hall
Barangka Health Center
Barangka Multipurpose Hall
Barangka Police Station
Barangka Public Cemetery
Dela Costa Homes Community Center
Dela Costa Homes Basketball Gymnasium
Urban Bliss Barangka Gymnasium

Landmarks and buildings
Ateneo De Manila University (Marikina side)
Arrupe International Residences
Center for Family Ministries
San Jose Seminary
Barangka Credit Cooperative Main Office
Col. San Pascual Building
Honda Cars Marikina
Loyola Memorial Park
Loyola Memorial Chapels and Crematorium
Loyola Memorial Park Administration Building
The Last Supper Memorial Monument
Plaza De Las Flores
Plaza Delos Kapitanes
Riverbanks Center
Bonfire Grill
Courtyard Dormtel
E-Com Buildings (Main and Annex)
ICT Building
Marikina's Largest Pair of Shoes in the World
Marikina River Park
Philippine Science Centrum
Renaissance Convention Center
Riverbanks Activity Area Open Building
Riverbanks Amphitheater
Riverbanks Arcade Building
Riverbanks Development Corporation Main Office
Riverbanks Mall Building
Riverbanks North Triangle open area
Riverbanks Plaza
Riverbanks Station
The Studio Building

Schools
Barangka Elementary School
Barangka National High School
Marikina Disciple Church Christian School
Mother of Angels School
Providence Christian School

Churches
Iglesia ni Cristo Local ng Barangka, Marikina West
Mary The Queen Chapel
San Jose Manggagawa Chapel
Queen of Angels Chapel Riverbanks

Roads
Major roads
Marikina-Infanta Highway (Marcos Highway)
Andres Bonifacio Avenue
Riverbanks Avenue
FVR Road

Primary streets
General Julian Cruz (Chorillo) Street
Don Gonzalo Puyat Street
Saint Joseph Street (Dela Costa Homes)
Berchmans Street
Kabo Pio Street
F. Tuazon Street
Yen Street (UBB)

Bridges and overpasses
Barangka Flyover
Diosdado Macapagal Bridge
Monte Vista Footbridge
Marcos Bridge

References

See also
Marikina
Riverbanks Center

Barangays of Metro Manila
Marikina